"Hey Boy" is a song by Swedish group Teddybears from their album Fresh. It was released as the album's second single in 2004 and reached the top 20 in Sweden. The music video received airplay on ZTV.

Track listing 
 CD single
 "Hey Boy" (Single Edit) – 3:24
 "Hey Boy" (Instrumental Version) – 3:24

Charts

Weekly charts

Year-end charts

Blog 27 version 

"Hey Boy (Get Your Ass Up)" is a song performed by Polish band Blog 27 from their 2005 debut album LOL. The track is a cover version of a 2004 Teddybears' song. It was released as Blog 27's second single in November 2005 and became very popular in Poland, particularly with teenage audiences. The song was released internationally in spring 2006 and charted within the top 40 in other European countries. It could not chart in Blog 27's home country where there was no official singles sales chart at that time, but it did enter a number of radio and magazine charts based on the fans' votes. At the end of 2006, "Hey Boy (Get Your Ass Up)" was singled out by Billboard senior editor Charles Eddy as one of the best songs of 2006 even though the single was not released on the US market.

Track listing 
CD maxi single
"Hey Boy (Get Your Ass Up)" (Short Edit) – 3:23
"Hey Boy (Get Your Ass Up)" (Extended Version) – 4:02
"Hey Boy (Get Your Ass Up)" (Karaoke Version) – 3:23
"Hey Boy (Get Your Ass Up)" (Video)

Digital download
"Hey Boy (Get Your Ass Up)" – 3:23
"Hey Boy (Get Your Ass Up)" (Extended Version) – 4:02
"Hey Boy (Get Your Ass Up)" (Karaoke Version) – 3:23

Charts

Torgny Melins version 
Swedish dansband Torgny Melins recorded a cover of "Hey Boy" for their album Dansbander and released as a single in 2006.

Track listing 
 CD single
 "Hey Boy" – 3:20
 "P3 Guld Awards 2006 Medley" – 4:30

References 

2004 singles
2004 songs
2005 singles
Blog 27 songs
Epic Records singles
Kontor Records singles
Songs written by Joakim Åhlund
Songs written by Klas Åhlund
Swingfly songs
Teddybears (band) songs